Sonchus arvensis, the field milk thistle, field sowthistle, perennial sow-thistle, corn sow thistle, dindle, gutweed, swine thistle, or tree sow thistle, is a species of flowering plant in the family Asteraceae. S. arvensis often occurs in annual crop fields and may cause substantial yield losses.

Description

Distribution
Sonchus arvensis is native to Eurasia, where it is widespread across most of the continent. It has also become naturalized in many other regions, and is considered an invasive noxious weed in some places, such as North America (including Prince Edward Island), Russia, New Zealand, and Australia.

It grows in areas such as pastures, roadsides, bushlands and the shorelines of lakes, rivers and sea coast.

Uses
The young leaves, when less than a few inches long and not bitter in taste, can be mixed with other greens to make salad. They can also be boiled in a small quantity of water, changed once. The plant can contain toxic nitrates.

Gallery

References

External links
Tropicos.org: photo of herbarium specimen at Missouri Botanical Garden

arvensis
Flora of Europe
Medicinal plants of Europe
Plants described in 1753
Taxa named by Carl Linnaeus